Dracula is a 1979 pinball machine released by Stern Electronics. The game is based on the popular character Dracula.

Description
The pinball machine has unique rules and a quick gameplay with a well-made layout and lots to shoot at.

The cabinet side art features a dark purple design with a vampire. The full moon and a lone bat can be seen on the side of the backbox.

See also
Bram Stoker's Dracula (pinball)
Monster Bash (pinball)

References

External links

Stern Electronics pinball machines
1979 pinball machines
Pinball machines based on works
Works based on Dracula